Mahinda III was King of Anuradhapura in the 9th century, whose reign lasted from 812 to 816. He succeeded his father Dappula II as King of Anuradhapura and was succeeded by his brother Aggabodhi VIII.

See also
 List of Sri Lankan monarchs
 History of Sri Lanka

References

External links
 Kings & Rulers of Sri Lanka
 Codrington's Short History of Ceylon

Monarchs of Anuradhapura
M
M
M